Dushyant Wagh (born 23 January 1987) is an Indian actor. He has acted in films like Tera Mera Saath Rahen, Dombivali Fast, 3 Idiots and in the TV serial Na Bole Tum Na Maine Kuch Kaha on Colors.

He also starred as Trivedi on Ishq Mein Marjawan that airs on Colors.

Career
Wagh made news for his sensitive portrayal of a mentally challenged boy in Mahesh Manjrekar's 2001 Hindi film Tera Mera Saath Rahen. Previously working in theatre, Wagh won his first role when Nilesh Divekar, an assistant of Mahesh Manjrekar, came to school in search of a suitable boy for the role.

He later on acted in the Marathi film Dombivali Fast (2005) where he played the role of Rahul Apte, the main protagonist Madhav Apte's son. He is remembered for his role in one of the most popular Bollywood film of 2009, 3 Idiots. He played the role of "Centimeter" in this film.

Wagh then played the adorable character of "Guru" in the Hindi Television serial Na Bole Tum... Na Maine Kuch Kaha.

Filmography

Television 

He also played an cameo role in the Historical television show Punyashlok Ahilyabai as Shivji/Bhola. (2021 present)

References

External links
 

Living people
Indian male soap opera actors
1987 births
Male actors in Marathi cinema
Male actors in Hindi cinema
Male actors in Hindi television
Marathi people
Male actors from Mumbai
Male actors in Marathi television